Deh Bid (also Romanized as Deh Bīd and Deh-e Bīd) is a village in Khobriz Rural District, in the Central District of Arsanjan County, Fars Province, Iran. At the 2006 census, its population was 483, in 105 families.

References 

Populated places in Arsanjan County